is a Japanese manga artist.

Profile
Takahashi is mostly known from his manga Crows, Worst and QP. Crows was loosely adapted into three live-action films: Crows Zero in 2007, Crows Zero 2 in 2009 and Crows Explode in 2014. Another manga of his, QP was adapted into a live action TV series in 2011. Crows was adapted into a 2-episode OVA series named Koukou Butouden Crows. Takahashi's latest work is called Jank Runk Family, published in the 19th issue of Akita Shoten's Young Champion magazine.

Works

Manga
Hey! Riki (1989), debut work
Crows (1990 – 1998), serialized in Monthly Shōnen Champion
Crows Gaiden (2014 – present), serialized in Monthly Shōnen Champion
Kiku (1992 – 1993), serialized in Weekly Shōnen Champion
QP (1998 – 2000), serialized in Young King
Worst (2001 – 2013), serialized in Monthly Shōnen Champion
Worst Gaiden (2009), serialized in Monthly Shōnen Champion
 (September 2016 – present), serialized in Young Champion

Other
Drop (novel illustrations), story by Hiroshi Shinagawa
Examurai Sengoku (character design)

References

External links

1965 births
Living people
Manga artists from Fukushima Prefecture